"Omaga" (stylized in all lowercase) is a song by Czech singer Benny Cristo. Much like its predecessor "Kemama" being a shorthand for "OK, Mama", the title "Omaga" is a shorthand for "Oh My God". The music video contains references to The Simpsons, Grease, The Shining, Pulp Fiction, Forrest Gump and Dirty Dancing, amongst others.

Eurovision Song Contest

The song was selected to represent Czech Republic in the Eurovision Song Contest 2021 in February 2021, after Benny Cristo was internally selected by the national broadcaster ČT. The semi-finals of the 2021 contest featured the same line-up of countries as determined by the draw for the 2020 contest's semi-finals. Czech Republic was placed into the second semi-final, held on 20 May 2021, and performed in the first half of the show.

References 

2021 songs
2021 singles
Eurovision songs of 2021
Eurovision songs of the Czech Republic
Benny Cristo songs